Wilhelm Hübotter (16 June 1895 – 28 July 1976) was a German architect. His work was part of the architecture event in the art competition at the 1932 Summer Olympics.

References

1895 births
1976 deaths
20th-century German architects
Olympic competitors in art competitions
People from Lüneburg (district)